Ugly Mountain is a summit in Pendleton County, West Virginia, in the United States.

Ugly Mountain is a volcanic neck with a diatreme breccia that formed during the Middle Eocene.

References

Mountains of Pendleton County, West Virginia
Mountains of West Virginia